Dania (Latin for Denmark) is the traditional linguistic transcription system used in Denmark to describe the Danish language. It was invented by Danish linguist Otto Jespersen and published in 1890 in the Dania, Tidsskrift for folkemål og folkeminder magazine from which the system was named.

Jespersen's Dania system differs from the later IPA, particularly concerning the Danish vowel letters. There is no official moderation of the standard and so specific phonetic symbols may differ from author to author. Also, there are no absolute phonetic references for the standard and so its usage is discouraged by Danish phoneticians and phonologists.

Jespersen led an international conference in 1925 to establish an alternative to the International Phonetic Alphabet that approached the IPA but retained several elements of Dania transcription.

Consonant chart

*These letter shapes are approximations. In Jespersen the loop goes the other way or (with ᶄ) crosses back over the leg of the letter. (See the image at the top of this page.) 
 2 The swash joins to these letters as an arm to the left.
 3 Or perhaps ɋ.

For mixed voicing, one normally writes (e.g. for voiced m) mh for final voicelessness and hm for initial voicelessness, with roman-type m for fully voiceless . But there are two ligatures: hw > ƕ and hj > ꜧ. Roman-type b, d etc. are fully voiced, sounds which occur in dialects such as Bornholmsk. Note that roman typeface indicates a modally voiced sound with plosives, a voiceless sound with sonorants and laterals, and a partially voiceless sound with fricatives/approximants.

Vowel chart
A slash separates 'thin/narrow' from 'wide' vowels. A mid dot may be added for length. The comma for stød combines with this to form the 'comma-punkt'.

* Mid ė, ø̇, 0 are weak allophones of e, ø, o.
1 This is an italic . It may look the same as italic  in some fonts.
2 This is an italic . It may look the same as italic  in some fonts.
3 ü and u̇ are the Swedish and Norwegian orthographic 'u', respectively.

1925 Copenhagen conference
A conference held in Copenhagen in 1925 under the auspices of the Union Académique Internationale (UAI) produced recommendations for an international phonetic alphabet that was a compromise between Dania transcription, the still nascent IPA alphabet, and other systems then in use. Members of the convention objected, for example, to the non-iconic handling of palatal consonants in the IPA, and they excluded the letter  altogether. The system is as follows:

Phonetic transcription is demarcated by square brackets, [...], and transcription by parentheses overstruck with small circles (as in Palaeotype, not supported by Unicode as of 2021). 

Long vowels are marked by a high dot, [a·], and half-long vowels by a low dot, [a.]. Extra-long vowels are [a··]. 

Stress is [ˈa], [ˌa], [ˈˈa] or [ˈa] (before the syllable, not just the vowel) as in the IPA. It may be lexical or prosodic. 

Tone is indicated by staveless marks before the syllable, e.g. [ˉa] level, [´a] rising, [ˋa] falling, [ˆa] rising-falling, [ˇa] falling-rising, [˜a] 'waving'. [´a] and [ˋa] are also used for the 'simple' and 'compound' tones of Norwegian and Swedish. 

Syllabic is [n̥] and non-syllabic [i̯]. 

[n̬] for voiceless (the opposite meaning of that diacritic in IPA) and [h̩] for voiced. (A diacritic that resembles '()' joined at their tips, not supported by Unicode, is an alternative choice for 'voiced'.)

Nasal vowels are e.g. [ą]. 

Labialization is [n̫]. The same diacritic turned 180° (not supported by Unicode, approximately [u̼]) is used for 'unrounded'. 

Dental consonants are e.g. [t̪], retroflex either [ʈ] or [ṭ]. 

Palatal consonants are marked, as in Dania transcription, with the looped tail of a cursive j. This is found on both alveolar t d ʦ s z n l and velar k g x (the last equivalent to IPA [ç]). [g-loop loses its original tail, so that it looks like c with a looped j tail]. 

Palatalized consonants are either [n̑] or [n ̑]. Finer shades may be indicated by [tⁱ], [tᵉ] etc.

[ʃ ʒ] are retained generic hushing fricatives, covering both [ʂ ʐ] and palatal s-loop, z-loop. 

For fricatives, Greek [ϕ β] (bilabial), [ϑ δ] (dental) and [χ γ] (velar) are used. Cyrillic ф may be used for Greek ϕ to avoid confusion with the vowel ø. Greek δ should have a flat top, as it often does in handwriting. Latin x may be used for Greek χ. 

[ƕ] is provided as an alternative to voiceless [w̬]. 

For IPA [j], dotless [ȷ] is used, to avoid confusion with the many national values of Latin j.

For the velar nasal, a variant with the tail is raised to [ꬻ] (as in Teuthonista) was chosen to avoid clashing with diacritics placed under the letter. 

Uvulars are small-cap Latin [ᴋ] (or [q]), [ɢ], [ɴ], [ʟ] (predating any IPA letter for this sound), [ʀ] and full-cap Greek [Χ] [Γ] for the fricatives. 

Pharyngeals are [ħ] and [ᵋ] (the latter a Unicode approximation).

[ʼ] is glottal stop, [tʽ] weak aspiration, [th] strong aspiration. 

[r] is a trill; [ř] the Czech sound written the same way. [ꭋ] is a dorsal (but not uvular) rhotic. 

For clarity, ligatures may be used for affricates, as in the IPA of the time. 

Unreleased plosives are marked with a raised square, e.g. [t⸋]. 

Clicks are indicated with a raised triangle over or after a letter (not supported by Unicode, but approximately [t̄̂] or [tᐞ]).

Cyrillic [ы] was chosen for the high central unrounded vowel.

[ä ȧ a] may be used in place of [a ɑ] to avoid the confusion of the latter in italic typeface. 

A closer vowel is [ẹ] (as in Lepsius) or [e͔]; a more open vowel is [e̠] or [e͕].

See also
Teuthonista

References

External links
 Otto Jespersen: Dansk lydskrift (from Dania, vol. 1 (1890-1892), pp. 33-79) (Danish)
 Marius Kristensen: Vejledning til brugen af Danias lydskrift, Copenhagen, 1924 (Danish)

See also

Danish language
Phonetic guides
Phonetic alphabets